Wheelchair basketball was one of the events featured at the 2018 Asian Para Games, which took place in Jakarta, Indonesia from 6 to 13 October 2018.

Qualification
Men's

Women's

Results

Men's tournament

Preliminary round

Group A

Fixtures

Group B

Fixtures

Final round

Ninth place game

Seventh place game

Fifth place game

Semi-finals

Bronze medal game

Gold medal game

Women's tournament

Preliminary round

Group A

Fixtures

Group B

Fixtures

Final round

Quarter-finals

Semi-finals

Fifth place game

Bronze medal game

Gold medal game

Final standings

Medalists

See also 
 Basketball at the 2018 Asian Games

References

2018
2018–19 in Asian basketball
International basketball competitions hosted by Indonesia
2018 Asian Para Games events
2018 in wheelchair basketball